Giulio Parodi (born 30 September 1997) is an Italian professional footballer who plays as a defender for  club Fermana on loan from Pro Vercelli.

Club career

Early career
Born in Bari, Parodi began his career as a player of hometown club A.S. Bari. He left Bari in 2013, when he was signed by Serie A reigning champions Juventus to play for their Primavera side.

Juventus
After impressing for the Primavera side, Parodi was named in the Juventus first-team squad twice in the 2014-15 season, remaining an unused substitute in the 2–0 win over Inter Milan and also in the 2–0 win over Lazio in the final of the 2015 Supercoppa Italiana. On 4 August 2016, Parodi was loaned to Lega Pro side Pordenone until June 2017.  On 18 July 2017 the loan was extended for another year to 30 June 2018.

Pro Vercelli
On 15 January 2021, Parodi moved to Serie C club Pro Vercelli on a permanent deal. He missed most of the 2020–21 and 2021–22 seasons with an ACL rupture. On 24 August 2022, Parodi was loaned by Fermana.

International career
On 23 February 2012, Parodi played a friendly match for Italy U15 against Belgium U15.

References

External links
 

1997 births
Living people
Footballers from Bari
Italian footballers
Italy youth international footballers
Association football defenders
Serie C players
Juventus F.C. players
Pordenone Calcio players
Juventus Next Gen players
F.C. Pro Vercelli 1892 players
Fermana F.C. players